Workaway is a platform that allows members to arrange homestays and cultural exchange. Volunteers or "Workawayers", are expected to contribute a pre-agreed amount of time per day in exchange for lodging and food, which is provided by their host.

How it works
Hosts register at workaway.info and are expected to provide information about themselves, the type of help they require to be performed, the accommodation they offer and the sort of person they are expecting. Workawayers create an online profile including personal details and any specific skills they might have, after which they can contact hosts through the website and discuss a possible exchange.

Workaway is aimed at budget travellers and language learners looking to become more immersed in the country and culture they are journeying through while allowing local hosts to meet like-minded people who can provide the help they require. It has been described as a useful way to improve foreign language skills  as well as an opportunity to develop new talents and learn about local traditions.

The opportunities on offer are varied and based in a wide range of countries around the world. Some types of volunteering available include gardening, animal-care, cooking and farming, as well as more specialist and niche help requests.

One of the benefits for potentially isolated communities or people is the chance to bring the world to them via travellers using the site. Travellers can then profit from their host's knowledge of regional places of interest and their local environment. The ability to share space with a variety of people has been shown to enable cultural exchange and the chance to learn more about how others see the world. 

Workaway charges the 'Workawayer' a yearly membership fee to connect to hosts but does not charge the host a fee to list. The duration of an exchange can range from as little as a few days to over a year.

History
The idea for Workaway came about through the founder's travelling experiences. After extending his stay in Hawaii in the early 1990s by working in the hostel in which he was staying, he realized many travelers wanted to be more than just tourists. On returning home, he started offering a room in his own house in exchange for help on the land and the Workaway concept began.

See also
 Gift economy
 WWOOF
 Homestay
 Hospitality Club
 CouchSurfing

References

External links
 

Cultural exchange
Hospitality services